This is a list of the members of the Dewan Negara (Senate) of the Second Parliament of Malaysia.

Elected by the State Legislative Assembly

Nominated by the Prime Minister and appointed by the Yang di-Pertuan Agong

Footnotes

References

Malaysian parliaments
Lists of members of the Dewan Negara